The Pascagama River is a tributary of Pascagama Lake. It flows in the Northwest of Quebec, in Canada, in the administrative regions of:
Mauricie: in the extreme west of the territory of the town of La Tuque (canton of Deschamps);
Abitibi-Témiscamingue: in the easternmost part of Senneterre, in the La Vallée-de-l'Or Regional County Municipality (RCM), where is its mouth. In this region, the course of the river successively crosses the townships of Marceau, Buteux, Lagacé, Coursol and Juneau.

Forestry is the main economic activity of this watershed; recreational tourism activities come second.

The surface of the river is usually frozen from early November to the end of April, however, safe ice circulation is generally from early December to mid-April.

Geography

Toponymy

See also

Notes and references

Rivers of Mauricie
Rivers of Abitibi-Témiscamingue
Nottaway River drainage basin
La Vallée-de-l’Or
La Tuque, Quebec